

Gmina Świerzawa is an urban-rural gmina (administrative district) in Złotoryja County, Lower Silesian Voivodeship, in south-western Poland.

Neighbouring gminas
Gmina Świerzawa is bordered by the gminas of Bolków, Janowice Wielkie, Jeżów Sudecki, Męcinka, Pielgrzymka, Wleń and Złotoryja.

Villages
Apart from the town of Świerzawa, the gmina contains the villages of Biegoszów, Bronków, Dobków, Dynowice, Gozdno, Janochów, Jurczyce, Krzeniów, Lubiechowa, Nowy Kościół, Podgórki, Posępsko, Różana, Rząśnik, Rzeszówek, Sądrecko, Sędziszowa, Sokołowiec, Stara Kraśnica and Szczechów.

Twin towns – sister cities

Gmina Świerzawa is twinned with:
 Chocz, Poland
 Kottmar, Germany
 Malá Skála, Czech Republic

References

Swierzawa
Złotoryja County